The Newberry Consort is an early music ensemble from Chicago, Illinois.  It was established in 1986 and is affiliated with the Newberry Library Center for Renaissance Studies. The Consort is also in residence at the University of Chicago and Northwestern University. Reviewer Alan Artner praised a 2014 performance of the Consort as "...spiritedly played and sung... early music at its committed best."

The group performs music from the Medieval, Renaissance, and Baroque periods featuring a roster of local and international musicians. The Consort has recorded several albums for the Harmonia Mundi USA label.

Co-Directors
David Douglass, early violins
Ellen Hargis, soprano

Frequent and Recent Collaborators
Tom Zajac, multi-instrumentalist and vocalist
David Schrader, harpsichord
Charles Metz, harpsichord
Rachel Barton Pine, violin and rebec
Bruce Dickey, cornetto
Jeremy Ward, bass violin
Brandi Berry, violin and viola
Steven Player, vocalist and dancer

References

External links
The Newberry Consort Page
About the Consort
Interview with Mary Springfels, July 19, 1989

Early music consorts
Musical groups established in 1986
Musical groups from Chicago
1986 establishments in Illinois